In the Blink of an Eye is the second major album, their third full-length overall, by Japanese post-hardcore band FACT.  The first single, "Slip of the Lip", was released on December 16, 2009, and a music video was released prior to that.

Track listing
"In the Blink of an Eye" - 2:21
"This Is the End" - 2:04
"Slip of the Lip" - 3:03
"Silent Night" - 2:36
"Dec 2" - 3:19
"Part of It All" - 2:17
"1-3" - 1:42
"Behind a Smile" - 3:48
"Fade" - 4:12
"Risk of Disorder" - 2:20
"Goodbye to Good Morning" - 3:17
"Sunset" - 2:55
UK edition bonus tracks
"Letter to... (Ayashige/Wrench remix)"
"Hate Induces Hate (Dexpistols remix)"

Personnel 
 Hiro – Lead vocals
 Kazuki – Backing vocals and Rhythm guitars
 Eiji – Drums, percussion
 Tomohiro – Bass, Backing vocals
 Takahiro – Lead guitar, Backing vocals

References

Sources
FACT Myspace  FACT Official Website

2010 albums
Fact (band) albums
Avex Group albums
Hassle Records albums
Albums produced by Michael Baskette